Clubhouse is an American drama television series starring Jeremy Sumpter, Dean Cain, Christopher Lloyd, Mare Winningham and Kirsten Storms and produced by Icon Productions in association with Spelling Television. The theme song is "Our Lives" by The Calling.

Clubhouse originally aired in the United States on CBS on September 26 to November 6, 2004, leaving 6 of the 11 episodes from the first season unaired. The remaining episodes later aired on HDNet from June 30 to August 4, 2005.

Premise
The series is about a boy who gets his dream job working as a batboy for his favorite major-league baseball team, the fictional New York Empires. Throughout the story, 16-year-old Pete Young (played by Sumpter) goes through normal and not so normal problems of a teenager. Pete's sister (played by Storms) is a rebellious teen who deals with drinking, sex, and drugs.

The show is based on the experiences of Matthew McGough, a batboy for the New York Yankees who graduated from Williams College and Fordham University School of Law, and lives in New York City. His book Bat Boy: Coming of Age with the New York Yankees was published by Doubleday in 2005.

Cast

Main
 Jeremy Sumpter as Pete Young
 Dean Cain as Conrad Dean
 Dan Byrd as Mike Dougherty
 Kirsten Storms as Betsy Young
 Mare Winningham as Lynne Young
 Christopher Lloyd as Lou Russo
 J. D. Pardo as Jose Marquez
 John Ortiz as Carlos Tavares

Recurring
 Michael Jai White as Ellis Hayes
 Gabriel Salvador as Chris Pontecorvo
 Kevin G. Schmidt as Brad Saminski
 Tony Ervolina as Bobby	
 Leah Pipes as Jesse
 Steve Trombly as Bulldog
 Brian Tahash as Chuck
 Al White as Joe Ross
 Nancy Cassaro as Gwen
 Spencer Grammer as Sheila
 Cherry Jones as Sister Marie
 Jim Nantz as himself
 Richard Steinmetz as General Manager
 Greg Bond as Rudnick
 Christopher Wiehl as Kenny Baines
 Charles S. Dutton as Stuart Truman 
 Derrick McMillon as Detective Turnbull

Episodes

References

External links 
 
 Bianco, Robert, "'Clubhouse': Get caught looking at this gem." USA Today, September 23, 2004
 Shales, Tom, "'Clubhouse': CBS's World-Class Series." The Washington Post, September 25, 2004
 Gallo, Phil, Clubhouse review, Variety, September 23, 2004

2004 American television series debuts
2005 American television series endings
2000s American teen drama television series
American sports television series
Baseball television series
CBS original programming
English-language television shows
Television series about teenagers
Television series by CBS Studios
Television series by Spelling Television
Television shows set in New York City